The Daily Princetonian, originally known as The Princetonian and nicknamed the 'Prince', is the independent daily student newspaper of Princeton University.

Founded on June 14, 1876 as The Princetonian, it changed its name to The Daily Princetonian in 1892. It is the second oldest daily college newspaper in the country. Owned by The Daily Princetonian Publishing Co., the paper is financially independent from the university and is produced by around 200 undergraduate students managed by an editor-in-chief and a business manager. It has a daily circulation of 2,000 and has around 30,000 daily online hits. The current editor-in-chief, Rohit Narayanan, was elected in December 2022.

Former editors and columnists of the paper include a United States President, Supreme Court Justices, U.S. ambassadors, journalists at publications like The New York Times and The Washington Post, and several Pulitzer Prize winners. The paper has won a Silver Crown at the Columbia Crown Awards and was a finalist for a National Pacemaker Award in 2014.

History

19th century 
The Prince is the second oldest daily college newspaper in America. The paper was founded on June 14, 1876 as a biweekly publication named The Princetonian. As the college grew, the paper grew: it became a weekly in 1883 and a tri-weekly in 1885. The name would change to The Daily Princetonian when it was produced five afternoons a week in 1892; in 1895, it was produced six mornings a week. Early issues of the Prince called for unproctored examinations, a policy introduced with the implementation of the honor code system at the college in 1893. Another issue published a telegraphic report of a baseball game, one of the first times a college used a telegraph in its coverage.

20th century 
Throughout the pre-WWI years, the Prince saw improvements in its coverage and editorial policy. Woodrow Wilson was frequently covered as both the university and later United States president. In 1910, it incorporated Associated Press dispatches. It advocated for the abolition of mandatory chapel attendance, supported women's suffrage, and reinforced the ongoing revolt against the campus eating clubs. The 1920s saw the paper become more light-hearted, with the introduction of popular humorous columns, a weekly photograph supplement, and annual pieces like an April Fool's story.

The 1930s saw the paper have a more serious role. It partnered with The Harvard Crimson to persuade students to advocate against prohibition. It covered the ongoing world tension at the time preceding WWII, opening columns for those for and against U.S. intervention. Publication was suspended in February 1943 until the conclusion of the war. After the war, the Prince covered the death of Albert Einstein, the election of Robert Goheen a mere three hours after the faculty meeting, and other topics regarding university administration and sports. A common topic for news and editorials were eating clubs elections and debates over their social life influence.

In the 1960s, the Prince published articles on the assassination of John F. Kennedy, and the subsequent week-long cancellation of university events. Martin Luther King Jr.'s assassination saw the publication of letters, editorials, and more discussing his influence and further action for students. The paper continued as a progressive force, calling for coeducation and requesting increased resources targeted at minority enrollment. The Prince took a forward role in student activism against the Vietnam War, organizing events and playing a central force for a two-week recess so students could campaign for the November elections. In 1976, the paper celebrated its hundredth anniversary and held a seminar and two-day symposium.

21st century 
In January 2007, the Prince caused controversy when it published a fictitious article in its joke issue, which referenced a lawsuit by Jian Li, who sued Princeton alleging that he was denied admission for being Asian. It received complaints for its purposeful use of broken English and offensive stereotypes towards Asian-Americans. The Prince issued a statement concerning its motivations and expectations for the piece, stating that it did not mean to be offensive but rather satirical.

The paper's archives were digitized in 2012 and were named in honor of a long-time employee, Larry DuPraz. In 2021, the paper began publishing digital articles daily and print articles weekly.

Organization 

The Prince is owned by The Daily Princetonian Publishing Co., which is controlled by a Board of Trustees of mostly former Princeton editors and staffers. The organization is a registered nonprofit, and the organization and newspaper are independent from the university. The paper is produced and managed by a staff of around 200 undergraduate students and has an annual budget of more than $70,000. Its headquarters is located at 48 University Place on Princeton University's campus. The Prince has a daily print circulation of 2,000, and its website receives roughly 30,000 daily hits.

The paper is managed by an editor-in-chief and a business manager, and its staff is grouped into various sections, like news, sports, opinions, and more. In 1974, the Prince elected its first woman business manager, Judy E. Piper; in 1978, it elected its first woman editor, Anne C. Mackay-Smith. The current editor-in-chief is Rohit Narayanan, who was elected in December 2022.

Notable alumni and awards

Many columnists and editors for the Prince have gone on to hold prominent positions in both government, journalism, and more. Alumni include President of the United States Woodrow Wilson, Supreme Court Justices John M. Harlan and Elena Kagan, Governor of Illinois Adlai Stevenson, first Secretary of Defense James Forrestal, Secretary of the Air Force James H. Douglas, Jr., and U.S. ambassadors Livingston T. Merchant, Jacob D. Beam, Shelby C. Davis, Robert H. McBride, and William H. Atwood, among others. Philanthropist John D. Rockefeller III served on the paper's business board during his time at Princeton.

Notable journalists and writers include Pulitzer Prize winners Barton Gellman, Mark Stevens, Annalyn Swan, Richard Kluger, and Robert Caro. Others include The Washington Post writers Joel Achenbach and Catherine Rampell; The New York Times writers R.W. Apple, Jr., Bosley Crowther, and John B. Oakes; Hamilton Fish Armstrong of Foreign Policy, Kate Betts of Harper's Bazaar, Frank Deford of Sports Illustrated, William Greider of Rolling Stone, John Stossel of ABC News, and more.

Awards won by the Prince include a Silver Crown in the college newspaper category from the Columbia Scholastic Press Association in 2012 and becoming a 2014 finalist for the Associated College Press Online National Pacemaker Award.

References

Notes

Bibliography

Further reading 

 

Daily Princetonian, The
Publications established in 1876
Princeton University publications
Daily Princetonian, The
1876 establishments in New Jersey